or  is a village in Alta Municipality in Troms og Finnmark county, Norway. It has a population (2012) of 194.

References

Alta, Norway
Villages in Finnmark
Populated places of Arctic Norway